Y'lan Noel (born May 21, 1988) is a Panamanian-American actor. He is known for portraying Daniel King in the HBO television series Insecure (2016–present). He played the lead role in the 2018 horror film The First Purge.

Early life
Noel was born in Brooklyn, New York. He was further raised in Queens until his family moved to Stone Mountain, Georgia. He is of Panamanian descent. He began attending Morehouse College and transferred to New York University. He continued through Tisch School of Arts until he was called away to Los Angeles.

Career 
In 2015, Noel landed the role of Daniel King on Insecure. Noel described Daniel as being the opposite of him, "I was nervous about playing Daniel. I love being around women...but I’ve always felt a bit awkward, well, insecure, around women I’ve had crushes on. Daniel doesn’t seem to have any of that awkwardness... Daniel’s extremely confident and goes after what he wants."

In 2018, Noel played the lead role of Dmitri in The First Purge, which he considered very challenging, having said, "I feel like I started to actually physiologically relate to these fictional characters and what they would have to experience if they were to go about surviving the Purge."

In 2021, Noel was reported as cast in the lead for a television pilot based on the Sam Greenlee novel The Spook Who Sat By The Door, to be produced by Lee Daniels.

Personal life
Noel is a member of Kappa Alpha Psi.

Filmography

Film

Television

References

External links

1988 births
21st-century American male actors
African-American male actors
Lee Strasberg Theatre and Film Institute alumni
Living people
Male actors from New York City
People from Brooklyn
People from Queens, New York
Tisch School of the Arts alumni